E-type asteroids  are asteroids thought to have enstatite (MgSiO3) achondrite surfaces. They form a large proportion of asteroids inward of the asteroid belt known as Hungaria asteroids, but rapidly become very rare as the asteroid belt proper is entered. There are, however, some that are quite far from the inner edge of the asteroid belt, such as 64 Angelina. They are thought to have originated from the highly reduced mantle of a differentiated asteroid.

Description
E-type asteroids have a high albedo (0.3 or higher), which distinguishes them from the more common M-type asteroids. Their spectrum is featureless flat to reddish. Probably because they originated from the edge of a larger parent body rather than a core, E-types are all small, with only three (44 Nysa, 55 Pandora, 64 Angelina) having diameters above 50 kilometres and no others above 25 kilometers (the biggest three also orbit atypically far, c. 3 AU, from the Sun). Aubrites (enstatite achondrite meteorites) are believed to come from E-type asteroids, because Aubrites could be linked to the E-type asteroid 3103 Eger.

This grouping may be related to the Xe-type of the SMASS classification.

E-Belt

The E-type asteroids of the Hungaria family are thought to be the remains of the hypothetical E-belt asteroid population.  The dispersal of most of that hypothetical E-Belt might have been caused by the outwards migration of the gas giants of the Solar System according to simulations done under the Nice model – and these dispersed E-Belt asteroids might in turn have been the impactors of the Late Heavy Bombardment.

Exploration
On September 5, 2008, ESA's robotic spaceprobe Rosetta visited the E-type asteroid 2867 Šteins.  Spectral data from the spacecraft confirmed the asteroid was composed mainly of iron-poor minerals such as enstatite (magnesium-rich pyroxene), forsterite (magnesium-rich olivine) and feldspar.

See also
Asteroid spectral types
L-type asteroid
S-type asteroid
X-type asteroid
2867 Šteins

References

Asteroid spectral classes